Asian Americans represent a growing share of the national population and of the electorate. The lower political participation of Asian Americans has been raised as a concern, especially as it relates to their influence on politics in the United States. In the 21st century, Asian Americans have become a key Democratic Party constituency.

Officeholders

Elected national officials

Vice president

Congress

Senate
(Note: Senators are organized first in chronological order according to their first term in office, then second in alphabetical order according to their surname.)

House of Representatives 
(Note: Representatives are organized first in chronological order according to their first term in office, then second in alphabetical order according to their surname.)

State and local government

Governors

Statewide offices

State Legislative offices

Mayors

Historic
Benito Legarda and Pablo Ocampo, joined the House in 1907 as Resident Commissioners, becoming the first Asian Americans to serve in the Congress, albeit as non-voting members.
 In 2010, Inouye was sworn in as President Pro Tempore making him the highest-ranking Asian American politician in American history until Kamala Harris was the first Asian American to become Vice President of the United States in November 2020, and assumed the role of President of the U.S. Senate.

Current
There are presently 16 Asian Americans or Pacific Islanders in the House and 2 in the Senate in the 118th United States Congress. The following marks the total number of Asian Americans in the U.S. Congress since 1957: 39 representatives and 9 senators. Representatives include those from Japanese, Taiwanese, Filipino, Thai, Indian, and Chinese backgrounds.

 Representatives Doris Matsui, Mark Takano, Jill Tokuda, and Senator Mazie Hirono are Japanese American.
 Representative Judy Chu is Chinese American.
 Representatives Grace Meng and Ted Lieu are Taiwanese Americans.
 Representative Bobby Scott is Filipino American.
 Senator Tammy Duckworth is Thai American.
 Representatives Ami Bera, Raja Krishnamoorthi, Pramila Jayapal, Ro Khanna, and Shri Thanedar are Indian American.
 Representatives Andy Kim, Michelle Steel, Young Kim, and Marilyn Strickland are Korean American.

Note that Strickland and Scott are all multiracial. Strickland is one-half Korean and one-half African American; Scott is one-fourth Filipino and three-fourths African American.

Cabinet

Norman Mineta became the first Asian American Cabinet member when he was appointed secretary of commerce by President Bill Clinton in 2000. He then served as secretary of transportation from 2001 to 2006.

In the George W. Bush Administration, Elaine Chao became the first, and thus far only, Asian American woman to serve as a Cabinet secretary when she became the secretary of labor in 2001, serving until 2009. She has also served as secretary of transportation in the administration of Donald Trump in 2017, serving until her resignation in 2021.

In 2009, President Barack Obama appointed Eric Shinseki to the position of secretary of veterans affairs, which he held until 2014. Shinseki was the first Asian American to hold this position. Steven Chu, the first Asian American to hold the position of secretary of energy, served from 2009 to 2013. Additionally under Obama, Gary Locke served as secretary of commerce from 2009 to 2011.

In 2017, President Donald Trump appointed Nikki Haley the first Indian American to serve in a permanent Cabinet-level position when she was confirmed to the position of ambassador to the United Nations in 2017. She held the position until 2018.

In 2021, Kamala Harris became the highest ranking Asian-American to serve in a cabinet as 49th Vice President of the United States. President Joe Biden also appointed Katherine Tai to serve as U.S. Trade Representative, a cabinet-level position.

Presidential and vice-presidential candidates

In 1964, Hiram Fong, a Republican, became the first Asian-American candidate for president.

In 1972, Patsy Mink became the first Asian-American Democratic candidate for president, and the first Japanese-American candidate for president.

In 2015, Bobby Jindal, a Republican, became the first Indian-American candidate for president.

In 2017, Andrew Yang became the first Taiwanese-American and the first Asian-American male Democratic candidate for president.

In 2020, Tulsi Gabbard, who is of Samoan descent  became the second woman of color and the first Asian-American and Pacific-Islander (AAPI) presidential candidate to earn major party primary delegates.

In 2020, Kamala Harris became the first Asian-American major party candidate for vice president, and later elected the first Asian-American vice president of the United States.

Voting trends and party affiliation
From the 1940s to the 1990s most Asian Americans were anti-communist refugees who had fled mainland China, North Korea or Vietnam, and were strongly anti-Communist. Many had ties to conservative organizations. In recent years, more liberal Asian-American groups such as newer Chinese and Indian immigrants have greatly changed the Asian-American political demographics, as well as a larger proportion of younger Asian Americans, many of whom have completed college degrees.

During the 1990s and 2000s, Asian American voting behavior shifted from moderate support for the Republican Party to stronger support for the Democratic Party. In the 1992 presidential election Republican George H. W. Bush received 55% of the Asian-American vote compared to 31% for Democrat Bill Clinton. Asian Americans voted Republican and were the only racial group more conservative than whites in the 1990s, according to surveys. By the 2004 election, Democrat John Kerry won 56% of the Asian American vote, with Chinese and Indian Americans tending to support Kerry, and Vietnamese and Filipino Americans tending to support George Bush. Japanese-Americans leaned toward Kerry, while Korean-Americans leaned toward Bush. Democrat Barack Obama won 62% of the Asian American vote in the 2008 presidential election, with the margin increasing during the 2012 presidential election, where Asian Americans voted to re-elect Obama by 73%. In the 2014 midterm elections, based on exit polls, 50% of Asian Americans voted Republican, while 49% voted Democrat; this swing toward voting for Republicans was a shift from the strong Democratic vote in 2012, and had not reached 50% since 1996. The 2016 National Asian American Survey, conducted before the 2016 presidential election, found that 55% of Asian American registered voters supported Democratic candidate Hillary Clinton and only 14% supported Republican candidate Donald Trump.

Despite their growing trend of voting for Democrats in national elections, Asian Americans have tended to identify as independents and have not developed strong ties to political parties as a group. Due to the smaller size of the groups population, in comparison to the population as a whole, it has been difficult to get an adequate sampling to forecast voter outcomes for Asian Americans. In 2008, polls indicated that 35% considered themselves non-partisan, 32% Democrats, 19% independents, and 14% Republicans. The 2012 National Asian American Survey found that 51% considered themselves non-partisan, 33% Democrats, 14% Republicans, and 2% Other; Hmong, Indian, and Korean Americans strongly identified as Democrats, and Filipino and Vietnamese Americans most strongly identified as Republicans. In 2013, according to the Asian American Legal Defense and Education Fund, Chinese Americans were the least likely Asian American ethnicity to have a party affiliation, with only one third belonging to a party. The 2016 National Asian American Survey found that 41% of Asian Americans identified as non-partisan, 41% as Democrats (a modest increase from 2008 and 2012), and 16% as Republicans.

Neither the Republican nor Democratic parties have financed significant efforts to the registration of Asian Americans, however much more attention has been focused on contributions from Asian Americans, having once been referred to as potential "Republican Jews". As recently as 2006, the outreach efforts of America's two major political parties have been unbalanced, with the Democratic Party devoting more resources in attracting Asian Americans. In 2016, a majority of Asian-Americans possessed the same political views on racial profiling, education, social security, and immigration reform as the Democratic Party; the efforts to attract Asian-Americans has produced a proportionally significant growth in Democratic affiliation by Asian-Americans from 2012 to 2016 by 12 percent. In 2016, Vietnamese and Filipinos were the least likely Asian Americans to support the presidential campaign of Hillary Clinton, with Vietnamese the most likely to back the presidential campaign of Donald Trump. Political affiliation aside, Asian Americans have trended to become more politically active as a whole, with 2008 seeing an increase of voter participation by 4% to a 49% voting rate. In 2017, it was reported by The Washington Post that Asian Americans born outside of the United States trended to be more conservative, and more likely to identify as Republicans, while those who were born in the United States, who were generally younger, were more likely to identify being a Democrat.

See also
80-20 Initiative
Asian American and Pacific Islands American conservatism in the United States
List of Asian Pacific American Democrats

References

Further reading

Tanika Raychaudhuri. 2020. "Socializing Democrats: Examining Asian American vote choice with evidence from a national survey." Electoral Studies.

Asian-American culture
American politicians of Asian descent
Politics of the United States